Naga Phasa is a 1977 Indian Odia film directed by Basant Nayak. The movie stars Shriram Panda, Prashanta Nanda, Malvika Roy,Mohammad Mohsin, Banaja Mohanty and Bijay Mohanty in the leading roles, with Jai and Nari in supporting roles.

Music

	Mo Kola To Jhulana To Aakhi Mo Aeena Singer(s) : Akshaya Mohanty & Trupti Das
Lyricist : 	Music Director :  Akshaya Mohanty

Bada Bedaradi Mo Naali Paan Raja  ( Year :  1977 )
Singer(s) : Trupti Das & Geeta Patnaik
Lyricist :  Rajanikanta Nayak	Music Director :  Akshaya Mohanty

E Raati Pahiba Kebe E Pathara Kanhi Shesha  ( Year :  1977 )
Singer(s) : Trupti Das
Lyricist :  Akshaya Mohanty	Music Director :  Akshaya Mohanty

Gaadi Chale Pachhei Debi  ( Year :  1977 )
Singer(s) : Akshaya Mohanty & Trupti Das
Lyricist :  Akshaya Mohanty	Music Director :  Akshaya Mohanty

Je Dinu Paichhi Mo Priya  ( Year :  1977 )
Singer(s) : Akshaya Mohanty & Trupti Das
Lyricist :  Debadas Chhotaray	Music Director :  Akshaya Mohanty

Nadi Phere Sagaraku Pakshi Phere Nide  ( Year :  1977 )
Singer(s) : Akshaya Mohanty
Lyricist :  Akshaya Mohanty	Music Director :  Akshaya Mohanty

Tik Tik Tik Ghanta Chale  ( Year)
Film :  Nagaphasa	Singer(s) : Akshaya Mohanty
Lyricist :  Akshaya Mohanty	Music Director :  Akshaya Mohanty

References

 

1977 films
Films scored by Akshaya Mohanty
1970s Odia-language films